The Plateau-Mont-Royal borough council is the local governing body of Le Plateau-Mont-Royal, a borough in the City of Montreal. The council consists of seven members: the borough mayor (who also serves as a Montreal city councillor), city council representatives for each of the borough's three electoral districts, and borough council representatives for the same three districts. 

The borough is a stronghold of support for Projet Montréal.

Members in the current term (2017-2021)

Members in previous terms

2013–17

2009–13

2005–09

Note: The Montreal Island Citizens Union was renamed as Union Montreal in 2007.

2002–05

References

Municipal government of Montreal